Harry & Charles is a three part Norwegian TV-mini series produced by the state broadcaster NRK. The series was released in 2009 and focused on the dissolution of the union between Sweden and Norway and the royal election of Prince Carl of Denmark.

Plot 
The series follows Prince Carl of Denmark (Charles), his wife Maud (Harry), their son Alexander and their Lady-in-waiting Tulle Carstensen, during the time before and after the dissolution of the union between Sweden and Norway in 1905. Prince Carl is faced with a dramatic decision when he is asked to become the new King of Norway.

Other historic characters include Prime minister Christian Michelsen, polar explorer Fridtjof Nansen and King Oscar II.

Cast 
The cast includes :-
 Jakob Cedergren - Prince Carl of Denmark/Haakon VII of Norway 
 Maria Bonnevie - Maud of Wales
 Viktor Andersen - Alexander 
 Laura Bro - Tulle Carstensen

References 

2009 Norwegian television series debuts
2009 Norwegian television series endings
Norwegian drama television series
Television shows set in Norway
NRK original programming

External links